Lieutenant-Colonel Cuthbert James   (29 February 1872 – 21 July 1930) was a British soldier and Conservative politician.

James was born in London, the second son of Walter James, 2nd Baron Northbourne, and his wife Edith Emmeline Mary (née Lane), niece of William Bagot, 3rd Baron Bagot. James was educated at Harrow School and Magdalen College, Oxford.

James joined the East Surrey Regiment in 1894 and the British Egyptian Army in 1899. He served in the Mahdist War, and followed this as administrator of Wadi Halfa, Deputy Assistant Civil Secretary to the Sudan Government, and Assistant Financial Secretary to the Egyptian Army.

After the First World War began in 1914, he rejoined the East Surrey Regiment. He served in France in 1915 and part of 1916, transferring in 1916 to the Royal Marines. He was promoted to Lieutenant-Colonel in the Army and was appointed a Commander of the Order of the British Empire in the 1919 Birthday Honours.

He represented Bromley in the House of Commons from 1919 until his death.

James married Florence Marion Packe, daughter of Hussey Packe, in 1905. He died in July 1930, aged 58, in Betteshanger, Kent. His wife survived him by three years and died in January 1933.

References

External links 
 

1872 births
1930 deaths
Younger sons of barons
East Surrey Regiment officers
Royal Marines officers
British Army personnel of World War I
Royal Marines personnel of World War I
Conservative Party (UK) MPs for English constituencies
UK MPs 1918–1922
UK MPs 1922–1923
UK MPs 1923–1924
UK MPs 1924–1929
UK MPs 1929–1931
Commanders of the Order of the British Empire
People educated at Harrow School
Alumni of Magdalen College, Oxford
British Army personnel of the Mahdist War
Military personnel from London